Devin McKenzie Druid (born ) is an American actor.  He is known for his portrayal of Tyler Down in the Netflix series 13 Reasons Why, based on the 2007 novel by Jay Asher.

Early life
Druid made his acting debut with the release of the documentary Trading Ages on February 17, 2012.

Career
Druid developed a love for performing after receiving a standing ovation at his school talent show, which brought him the opportunity to serve as the frontman for a rock band.

He was further influenced by his younger brother, Aidan Fiske, who was already performing. However, his final decision to enter the acting business came as he was watching a movie at the Byrd Theatre where he concluded that he loves everything about this industry and wanted to be a part of it.

Filmography

Film

Television

References

External links
 
 

American male television actors
American male film actors
1990s births
Living people
Year of birth uncertain
Place of birth missing (living people)
People from Chesterfield, Virginia